Sarny Raion is a raion in Rivne Oblast in western Ukraine. Its administrative center is the town of Sarny. Population: 

On 18 July 2020, as part of the administrative reform of Ukraine, the number of raions of Rivne Oblast was reduced to four, and the area of Sarny Raion was significantly expanded.  The January 2020 estimate of the raion population was

See also
 Subdivisions of Ukraine

References

External links
 rv.gov.ua 

Raions of Rivne Oblast
1939 establishments in Ukraine